Parliamentary elections were held in Kyrgyzstan on 4 October 2015.

Electoral system
The 120 seats in the Supreme Council were elected by proportional representation in a single nationwide constituency, with an electoral threshold of 7% on the national level, as well as 0.7% on each of the nine provinces. No party is allowed to hold more than 65 seats. Party lists were required to have at least 30% of the candidates from each gender, and every fourth candidate had to be of a different gender. Each list was also required to have at least 15% of the candidates being from ethnic minorities.

Biometric voter registration was introduced following claims of vote rigging in previous elections.

Campaign
Several political parties were formed in the run-up to the elections, often as an attempt by wealthy Kyrgyz to further their own interests. Incumbent Prime Minister Temir Sariyev claimed that places on party lists were sold to bidders, with rumours circulating that a high place on a party's list cost between $500,000 and £1,000,000.

Over 10% of prospective candidates were prevented from running due to criminal convictions, whilst one party's leader, a former boxer, was banned after it was claimed they beat up a rival candidate.

Conduct
Although there were some reports of voter fraud, the OSCE mission stated that the elections had been "lively and competitive" and "unique in this region", whilst the PACE mission stated that voters had "made their choice freely among a large number of contestants."

However, the OSCE noted problems with the biometric voter registration, with many people not having registered in time to receive their ID cards. The Council of Europe raised concerns regarding transparency of campaigns and party financing, stating that it should be improved.

Results

References

Elections in Kyrgyzstan
Kyrgyzstan
Parliamentary